ThunderCats is an animated television series, developed by Ethan Spaulding and Michael Jelenic for Cartoon Network. A reboot of the original 1980s TV series of the same name (which ran from 1985 to 1989), ThunderCats was produced and developed by American studio Warner Bros. Animation and animated by Japanese studio Studio 4°C, and combined elements of western animation with Japanese anime. The series began with an hour-long premiere on Cartoon Network on July 29, 2011. It is the final animated collaboration of both Arthur Rankin Jr. and Jules Bass, as Arthur Rankin Jr. died on January 30, 2014, and Jules Bass died on October 25, 2022.

Following the destruction of their home, the kingdom of Thundera, the ThunderCats (a group of humanoid felidaes) are forced to roam the planet Third Earth, in order to find a way to defeat the evil sorcerer Mumm-Ra, who plans on taking over the universe. Story-wise the series attempts to take a much darker and more cinematic approach than the original show, featuring a lot more focus on characterization and more sophisticated themes.

Initially planned for 52 episodes, it was confirmed by ThunderCats art-director Dan Norton in early 2013 that the show had been cancelled after only one season. Reruns of the show later aired on Adult Swim's Toonami block along with Sym-Bionic Titan.

Plot 
On the planet known as Third Earth, the Cats have lived and thrived for generations in the kingdom of Thundera. The Cats are led by Claudus, with his son and heir Lion-O. One night the kingdom is attacked by the Lizard army led by the evil sorcerer Mumm-Ra. With them, the Lizards bring technology (a concept unfamiliar to the Cats). Because of this, Thundera is destroyed, Claudus is killed by Mumm-Ra, and the rest of the Cats are enslaved. A small band of surviving Thunderians led by Lion-O (who wields the powerful Sword of Omens) flee the destroyed city in order to seek out the Book of Omens which is said to have the knowledge needed to defeat Mumm-Ra. Once they find it, the ThunderCats realize that in order for them to defeat Mumm-Ra, they must unite all the different species living on Third Earth. The ThunderCats also discover that they have to find three stones of power which if found by Mumm-Ra will give him power to become the most powerful being in the universe.

Characters

ThunderCats 

 Lion-O (voiced by Will Friedle) – The leader/Lord of the ThunderCats. The biological son of King Claudus, Lion-O was a misunderstood teenager in Thundera, being the only one in the kingdom who believed that technology and Mumm-Ra existed. Because of his beliefs, many felt he was unworthy to become king, often favoring his adopted older brother, Tygra, for the position. After the fall of Thundera and the death of King Claudus, Lion-O becomes the new Lord of the ThunderCats, leading the team to find a way to defeat Mumm-Ra. Even though Lion-O can be a bit of a hot-head, he's by far the most patient and understanding cat of the team. Lion-O also believes that the other races of Third Earth should be treated equally, as seen when Lion-O was defending two persecuted Lizards from some Thunderians. He wields the Sword of Omens, a powerful mystical weapon. 
 Tygra (voiced by Matthew Mercer) – The adopted older brother of Lion-O. Originally, Tygra was the crown prince of Thundera but as Lion-O was born, he couldn't succeed his adoptive parents as the ruler of Thundera (he's still a prince, next in line for the throne after Lion-O). This resulted in Tygra hating his brother for things beyond Lion-O's control, such as losing the crown and their mother, who had died giving birth to Lion-O. Tygra constantly worked to show that Lion-O wasn't worthy to succeed Claudus as the King of Thundera. Tygra also possesses extreme xenophobia, a jealous streak, and both an inferiority and a superiority complex, all of which often cause friction between the two brothers. Tygra is adept at many weapons, though typically defaults to using his bullwhip. 
 Cheetara (voiced by Emmanuelle Chriqui) - One of the last remaining cleric warriors. Cheetara initially served as a mentor to Lion-O, since she never shunned him for his interests in technology and initially seems to support his kindness to other races. Being a cheetah as well as a cleric, she has immense speed and deft agility which is often used in combat. Both Lion-O and Tygra have an interest in her but she ultimately chooses to be with Tygra since the two share a deeper bond. Lion-O later comes to accept them being together.
 Panthro (voiced by Kevin Michael Richardson) - One of King Claudus' most loyal soldiers. Panthro, along with his friend, Grune, were originally sent by Claudus to find the Book of Omens, but their attempted search resulted in Mumm-Ra's release and Grune betraying Panthro. While fighting Grune, Panthro fell down an abyss and was seemingly killed. Panthro survived and constructed the ThunderTank, which he later used to save Lion-O's group from Slithe's platoon in "Song of the Petalars". Though he questioned Lion-O's ability to lead at first, feeling that he was too young to be the King, Panthro eventually accepted him as the new Lord of the ThunderCats. Panthro's weapons consist of nunchucks and the ThunderTank. He later gets a pair of extending cybernetic arms after getting his organic ones cut off by a closing portal.
 Wilykit and Wilykat (voiced by Madeleine Hall and Eamon Pirruccello) - Fraternal twin siblings who were originally from a lower-class family in the countryside, consisting of them, their parents, and younger brother and sister. After the twins lost their father to a tornado, the family began to become more down-trodden, with their mother struggling to make ends meet. Eventually, the Wily-twins decided to run away to find the lost city of El Dara, so they could become rich and help their family. Upon arriving to Thundera, the sister (Wilykit) and brother (Wilykat) were forced to become street urchins and pickpockets in order to survive the slums, with their aspirations being the only thing keeping them going. When the Lizards attacked Thundera, the two managed to escape during the chaos, before eventually teaming up with Lion-O, Tygra, Cheetara and Snarf on their journey. Wilykit uses a special melodic instrument that can hypnotize their opponents. 
 Snarf (voiced by Satomi Kōrogi) - A creature of unknown origin and species who was originally Lion-O's personal caretaker when he was a baby. Now that Lion-O is fully grown and can take care of himself, Snarf is more of a pet to the young lord, but still cares very much about Lion-O and is very protective of him. Snarf speaks in a strange language that only Lion-O seems to understand.

Antagonists and villains 
 Mumm-Ra (voiced by Robin Atkin Downes) - The main villain of the series. An eternal servant of the Ancient Spirits of Evil, Mumm-Ra is himself a Spirit of Evil, with the sole purpose of conquering the universe. Centuries prior to the series, Mumm-Ra used advanced technology and dark magic to enslave all the animals into serving him. With them under his command, he sought to gather the four Power Stones, which, if attached to the Sword of Plun-Darr, would give him ultimate power. By managing to take the Warstone (which would later be known as the Eye of Thundera), the ThunderCat known as Leo (with help from the other animals) was able to defeat Mumm-Ra and strip him of the other Power Stones. But when Mumm-Ra's spacecraft was pulled into Third Earth's atmosphere, he entered his tomb to escape the crash and leave everyone else to die. However, the controls were damaged and Mumm-Ra was trapped within his own spacecraft, as the stones and survivors spread across Third Earth. Many centuries later, Mumm-Ra manipulated Grune into releasing him, and was able to orchestrate Thundera's downfall. Now Mumm-Ra not only plans to obtain the Eye of Thundera, but also regain the other three Power Stones and the Sword of Plundarr while gathering some allies to assist him.
 Grune (voiced by Clancy Brown) - Grune was one of King Claudus' most trusted generals, and best friends with Panthro. Being very ambitious and power-hungry Grune attempted to prove himself to Claudus for a promotion, but instead Claudus chose Lynx-O, and assigned Grune and Panthro to find the Book of Omens. Grune felt betrayed and drove himself mad with his own paranoia. Eventually, his jealousy towards the king was used by Mumm-Ra to convince Grune to become his follower and serve a key role in Thundera's downfall. However, Grune also intended to betray Mumm-Ra in the long run prior to leading the attack on the Elephants' village to obtain the Spirit Stone there, resulting with Grune getting sucked into the Astral Plane.
 Slithe (voiced by Dee Bradley Baker) - One of Mumm-Ra's generals and the leader of the Lizards. Slithe serves Mumm-Ra in order for his kind to take revenge on the ThunderCats for generations of persecution. Succeeding in ransacking Thundera, Slithe pursues Lion-O's group before overseeing the search for the Book of Omens and later the Powerstones.
 Addicus (voiced by Robin Atkin Downes) - A bloodthirsty ape-like barbarian who committed crimes against the Bird Nation and was sentenced to a death drop from high up in his captors' domain. However, Addicus is rescued from the fall by Slithe and recruited to be one of Mumm-Ra's new generals. Accepting the proposal, Addicus is allowed to get his revenge on the Bird Nation as Addicus states that they "owe him a last meal".
 Kaynar (voiced by Dee Bradley Baker) - A jackal-like psychopath who is recruited as one of Mumm-Ra's generals. Kaynar was about to be placed in solitary confinement within a Dog Prison when he was recruited by Slithe to be one of Mumm-Ra's new generals. Though preferring his cell, Kaynar accepts Slithe's proposal when he mentions that he can slaughter ThunderCats while allowed to "say goodbye" to his jailers.
 Vultaire (voiced by Michael McKean) - A prefect of Avista who is arrogant and sees himself above those who live on the land, especially the ThunderCats whom he considers to be manipulative barbarians. Though aiding the ThunderCats in fighting off Mumm-Ra's army, Vultaire betrays his fellow Avistans and aligns himself with Mumm-Ra upon witnessing his power firsthand. Vultaire shoots down Tygra and then quotes to Addicus "the enemy of my enemy is my friend". Vultaire joins Slithe, Kaynar, and Addicus into fighting Tygra, Panthro, and Cheetara prior to the latter knocking him out before Tygra can get payback for the bird's treachery. After Mumm-Ra claimed the Tech Stone, Vultaire joined Mumm-Ra's forces into retreating from Avista.
 Pumyra (voiced by Pamela Adlon) - A cat who originally fought during the fall of Thundera before being wounded and left to die under rubble. In her final moments, Pumyra died disillusioned, hateful, and resentful towards Lion-O and company for leaving Thundera, believing they had ignored her pleas for help and had left her and their species to die. Sensing her hate, Mumm-Ra resurrected Pumyra to serve him as his spy and lover, placing her among the captive Thunderian slaves to be sold to Ratar-O where she was later sold to Dobo. From there, meeting Lion-O and managing to keep her need for revenge in check, Pumyra earns his trust and love while serving as a beacon for Mumm-Ra to regain the Sword of Plun-Darr and track the ThunderCats' movement. It was during the siege of Avista that Pumyra reveals her true colors by giving the Tech Stone to Mumm-Ra. After taking hits from both Ro-Bear Bill and Dobo, Pumyra leaves with Mumm-Ra while promising to kill Lion-O the next time they meet.
 Ancient Spirits of Evil (voiced by Jim Cummings, Robin Atkin Downes and Kevin Michael Richardson) - Four dark spirits that are the source of Mumm-Ra's powers and his eternal masters. They resemble a Lizard, a Jackal, a Monkey, and a Vulture. The Ancient Spirits played a role in the creation of both the Sword of Plun-Darr, possessing a Thunderian blacksmith to forge the weapon, and the Sword of Omens, due to the blacksmith retaining the spirits' knowledge to forge a weapon similar to the previous creation. In "Native Son", it's revealed that the Ancient Spirits have been worshiped by the Tiger Clan after their ancestors were exiled to the mountains due to their continued loyalty to Mumm-Ra. When the Tiger Clan was on the verge of dying out from an epidemic, the Ancient Spirits offer to cure them in return that the newborn Tygra (who would grow up to become their stated primary enemy, not Lion-O) be sacrificed. When Javan, the leader of the clan and Tygra's biological father, refused to honor his end of the pact, the Ancient Spirits bound the souls of the Tiger Clan to the living world as shape-shifting shadow monsters that obey their every command. Some years later, a fully-grown Tygra found his way back to his ancestral home and freed his kin of the curse.

Other characters 
 Jaga (voiced by Corey Burton) - Jaga serves as head of Thundera's cleric warriors, possessing knowledge of ancient secrets, superhuman speed and the power to project lightning from his staff. In his prime, he used the "Sword of Omens" in an epic duel against Ratilla. At the start of the series, Jaga sacrifices himself to ensure Lion-O and his group escape. This resulted with him being tortured into revealing the location of the "Book of Omens" to Mumm-Ra, though doing his best to resist the villain's magic when sealed within a lantern, eventually his free will wavers along with his physical form. Though Jaga destroys the lantern that was keeping his soul intact to save Lion-O from Mumm-Ra, part of his soul took residence within the Book of Omens and becomes Lion-O's guide.
 Claudus (voiced by Larry Kenney) - The previous King of Thundera/Lord of the ThunderCats, Claudus is a stern father to Lion-O, his biological son, and Tygra, his adopted son. His wife, the unnamed previous Queen of Thundera/Lady of the ThunderCats, had died giving birth to Lion-O. When Grune and Panthro had fought bravely to get promoted to general, Claudus told them that he has given the job to Lynx-O. Claudus was the one who sent Panthro and Grune to find the Book of Omens. When Lion-O was fighting off some Thunderians who were beating up two imprisoned Lizards (where Lion-O was assisted by Tygra and Cheetara), Claudus arrived to break up the fight. He was convinced by Lion-O to let the Lizards go free and back to their homeland. When Thundera was being attacked by the Lizards, Claudus is murdered by Mumm-Ra (who was disguised as Panthro). Lion-O, Cheetara, and Tygra later hold a funeral pyre for him after escaping with the Sword of Omens. Claudus's voice actor played Lion-O in the original series.
 Lynx-O (voiced by Kevin Michael Richardson) - Lynx-O was a general under Claudus. He first made a cameo as one of Thundera's lookout sentries. It is currently unknown if he survived the fall of Thundera.

Episodes

Short

Production and development 
Despite being based on the original 1980s TV series, the 2011 version differs greatly from it, with many aspects of the original show's story and characters being different. When comparing the original series to the 2011 reboot, producer Michael Jelenic stated that "the old show felt more like a Saturday morning animated series and this feels more like a movie". Jelenic also said, that their take "is definitely darker but we've put a lot more focus on the characters and the arc, and because of that, we might have a few more sophisticated themes going on in this". Michael Jelenic stated that before work even began on the series, the makers mapped out an entire beginning, middle and end for the show's storyline, which was then broken-up into 13-episode arcs. Some stories from the original show were seen in these arcs.

The animation for the series was done by Warner Bros. Animation and Studio 4°C. According to supervising director of Studio 4 °C, Shinichi Matsumi, they were handed the basic concepts for the show by Warner Bros. and were assigned to adjust them into the Japanese anime design. Matsumi believed that they succeeded in pushing the style of anime in the show with a variety of visual elements, such as scene compositions, effects and colors, as well as the action scenes. Kevin Kliesch composed the music for ThunderCats, for which he took inspiration from John Williams, James Horner and Jerry Goldsmith, among others. Despite being orchestral, Kliesch also incorporated elements of electronics into the series' music.

Home media

Reception 
ThunderCats premiered on July 29, 2011 and attained a rating of 0.8, with over 2.4 million viewers. The highest rated show for that night received a 1.1, which makes the ThunderCats 0.8 a successful showing. The premiere episode of ThunderCats received very positive reviews, with some calling it "amazing" and "epic".

One of the things the premiere was praised for was its anime-inspired visuals. ComicBookMovies.com called the animation "beautiful" and "very fluid in motion", while Jeff Hidek, of Star News Online, described it as "sleekier(sic) [and] edgier", than the animation of the 1980s show. Brian Lowry, of Variety, also felt that the show had a "cool look". Many were also happy with the changes made to the story and characters. Kenneth Carter of The Birmingham News called the story "multi-faceted", and the characters layered and flawed. He also felt that the character's introductions didn't seem rushed, and that "we get a chance to get to know them a little before the action begins". Edward Adams of Creative Loafing described the show as "moody and character driven, highlighting the all-too-human flaws you'd expect from an action series like this", while IGN's Matt Fowler described the show's re-imagined world as "so original and strange, that even clichés tend to come across like revelations".

ThunderCats was also praised for the changes it made to its source material. Jeff Hidek felt that ThunderCats "successfully echoes the fun, wonder and all-around coolness of the original characters while ditching some of the dated trappings of '80s-syndication". Ken Tucker of Entertainment Weekly called the show "a rather canny rethinking of a series that probably didn't take a lot of thinking to conceive in the first place", while Edward Adams also said that "where in the original series the environment was bright and colorful, in the pilot episodes [of the 2011 series], the tones are much darker". Despite the changes the show made to the original TV series, many still recommended the 2011 series to fans of the original. Both Kenneth Carter and Edward Adams called the show "a pleasant surprise", with Carter adding that "if you have fond memories of ThunderCats, then you’ll love what you see here". Matt Fowler felt similarly, saying that "if you have an affinity for the old series, then you'll find ThunderCats somewhat entertaining".

Despite the positive response, some aspects of the show were criticized. Variety's Brian Lowry felt the series was designed as a marketing ploy for a new ThunderCats toyline, and that the show "represents a throwback to the drearily toy-driven 1980s, a period that seems destined to keep returning as much out of pragmatism as nostalgia".

Soundtrack 

A two-disc soundtrack album of Kevin Kleisch's music was released by La-La Land Records in October 2012, featuring suites from all but two of the episodes ("Trials of Lion-O, Part 2" and "The Pit"). The series' theme, by Jules Bass and Bernard Hoffer, also features.

Cancellation 
Following the end of the show's first season, ThunderCats was not immediately renewed for a second, which led to speculations that the series would be cancelled. During the 2012 San Diego Comic-Con, Michael Jelenic and Jeff Prezenkowski announced that ThunderCats had been put on hiatus as they had not yet received any word from Cartoon Network about the future of the series.  In March 2013, Dan Norton posted that further work on the series is unlikely in the near future. The first season ThunderCats episodes briefly aired in the new Toonami block on Adult Swim along with Sym-Bionic Titan. It was confirmed by ThunderCats art-director Dan Norton in early 2013 that the show had been cancelled after only one season.

Post-cancellation info 
In an interview with Dan Norton, Shannon Eric Denton, and Larry Kenney at Power-Con, they mentioned that if there was a season two, it would detail Mumm-Ra's hand in the creation of the Snarfs, Slithe's history with Lynx-O (which would also explain how Slithe and the Lizards sided with Mumm-Ra), Mumm-Ra tricking the ThunderKittens into bringing the Sword of Omens to him, so that he could send them to El Dara, and Pumyra being transformed into a wicked insectoid monster on a mission to capture the ThunderCats. The name of the final stone was also revealed as the Soul Stone.

Dan Norton later revealed in a 2017 interview that LEGO had been working on a toy line for the 2011 ThunderCats cartoon. When the show was not renewed, LEGO was allowed to retain its prototype toy designs and alter them into an original property, which became LEGO Legends of Chima.

References

External links 

 
 
 
 
 Advanced Review at AnimationInsider.net

2011 American television series debuts
2012 American television series endings
2011 Japanese television series debuts
2012 Japanese television series endings
2010s American animated television series
2010s American science fiction television series
2010s toys
American children's animated action television series
American children's animated drama television series
American children's animated space adventure television series
American children's animated science fantasy television series
Animated television series reboots
Anime-influenced Western animated television series
Animated television series about cats
Animated television series about extraterrestrial life
Cartoon Network original programming
English-language television shows
Japanese children's animated action television series
Japanese children's animated space adventure television series
Japanese children's animated science fantasy television series
Television series by Warner Bros. Animation
Television series set on fictional planets
2011 TV series
Toonami
Television series created by Michael Jelenic